Rondine al nido is a romance and one of the best known works of the Italian composer Vincenzo de Crescenzo, whose music was in the repertoire of Beniamino Gigli, Tito Schipa, Giuseppe Di Stefano, Richard Tucker, Luciano Pavarotti, Luigi Infantino, Ramón Vargas, Robert Dean Smith, Francesco Albanese, among many others.

Written by de Crescenzo in the early 20th century (1926), it deals with lost love.  While written and performed as a Neapolitan song, but with lyrics in Italian, it is more like an aria of the late Romantic period, demanding of the singer high intensity, high notes, and excellent breath control. It begins calmly and lightly, and then it becomes a passionate outburst. The second stanza repeats this scheme.

The song was sung by tenor Agostino Castagnola as The Doctor (EMH) portrayed by Robert Picardo in the 13th episode, Virtuoso, of the sixth season of the science fiction television series Star Trek: Voyager.  The episode was first aired on 26 January 2000 in the United States. The song is performed in Las Vegas at the Bellagio's fountain, which dances to Luciano Pavarotti's version of the song.

Rondine al Nido is also the title of a short story by Claire Vaye Watkins, from her collection Battleborn.

Lyrics 

Every performer interprets the song in his own way and there have been several changes from version to version. The following version is from the booklet of the 1990 album, Carreras Domingo Pavarotti in Concert.

Italian

I 
Sotto la gronda de la torre antica Una rondine amica, Allo sbocciare del mandorlo è tornata. Ritorna tutti gli anni, Sempre alla stessa data, Monti e mare essa varca    per tornar. Solo amore Quando fugge e va lontano Speri invano E non torni più, Speri invano E non torni più. 

II 
Nella penombra dolce della sera Passa la primavera. Cinguettano le rondini nel volo, Ebbre di luce e d'aria. Ed io son triste e solo; Monti e mare tu non varchi    per tornar. Mia piccina, Fosti tutta la mia vita; Sei fuggita E non torni più. Sei fuggita E non torni più. 

Translation in English

I 
Under the eaves of the old tower, as the almond tree blossoms, a friendly swallow has returned. Every year she returns, always in the same day. She crosses mountains and sea    to get back here. Only love flees and does not return. It makes you hope in vain, but it does not return. It makes you hope in vain, but it does not return. 

II 
In the soft twilight of evening springtime is passing. The swallows chatter in their flight — they are drunk with light and air. But I am sad and lonely. You do not cross mountains and sea    to come back to me. My little one, You were my whole life, but you ran away, never to return. You ran away, never to return!

Selected recordings 

The following is a selection of recordings that includes "Rondine al nido" sung by some of its most famous interpreters.  Recordings are listed in chronological order by year.

References 

1920s songs
Italian songs